Dennis Watkin Allsopp (13 February 1871 – 1921) was a footballer who played in The Football League for Nottingham Forest. A goalkeeper, he also played for Derby Junction.

Allsop made his league debut for Nottingham Forest at the Town Ground on 24 December 1892 in the 3–1 victory against Wolverhampton Wanderers. In his last competitive appearance at West Bromwich Albion on 16 April 1900, Forest lost 8–0.

Professional Baseball

In 1890 Allsopp played professional baseball for Derby Baseball Club in the National League of Baseball of Great Britain.

Career statistics

Honours
 Nottingham Forest
 FA Cup winner: 1898

References

1871 births
1921 deaths
Footballers from Derby
Association football goalkeepers
English footballers
English baseball players
Derby Junction F.C. players
Nottingham Forest F.C. players
English Football League players
FA Cup Final players